Piotr Skrobowski (born 16 October 1961 in Kraków) is a retired Polish football player. He played for a few clubs, including Wisła Kraków, Lech Poznań, and Hammarby IF (Sweden). He played for the Polish national team (15 matches) and was a participant at the 1982 FIFA World Cup, where Poland won the bronze medal.

References

External links
 

1961 births
Living people
Polish footballers
Polish expatriate footballers
1982 FIFA World Cup players
Poland international footballers
Poland youth international footballers
Ekstraklasa players
Allsvenskan players
Wisła Kraków players
Lech Poznań players
Hammarby Fotboll players
Expatriate footballers in Sweden
Footballers from Kraków
Association football defenders
Olimpia Poznań players